Indian English (IE) is a group of English dialects spoken in the Republic of India and among the Indian diaspora. English is used by the Indian government for communication, along with Hindi, as enshrined in the Constitution of India. English is also an official language in seven states and seven union territories of India, and the additional official language in seven other states and one union territory. Furthermore, English is the sole official language of the Indian Judiciary, unless the state governor or legislature mandates the use of a regional language, or if the President of India has given approval for the use of regional languages in courts.

Status
After gaining independence from the British Raj in 1947, English remained an official language of the new Dominion of India and later the Republic of India. Only a few hundred thousand Indians, or less than 0.1% of the total population, speak English as their first language, and around 30% of the Indian population can speak English to some extent.

According to the 2001 Census, 12.18% of Indians knew English at that time. Of those, approximately 200,000 reported that it was their first language, 86 million reported that it was their second, and 39 million reported that it was their third.

According to the 2005 India Human Development Survey, of 41,554 surveyed, households reported that 72% of men (29,918) spoke no English, 28% of them (11,635) spoke at least some English, and 5% of them (2,077, roughly 17.9% of those who spoke at least some English) spoke fluent English. Among women, 83% (34,489) spoke no English, 17% (7,064) spoke at least some English, and 3% (1,246, roughly 17.6% of those who spoke at least some English) spoke English fluently. According to statistics from the District Information System for Education (DISE) of the National University of Educational Planning and Administration under the Ministry of Human Resource Development, Government of India, enrollment in English-medium schools increased by 50% between 2008–09 and 2013–14. The number of English-medium school students in India increased from over 15 million in 2008–09 to 29 million by 2013–14.

According to the 2011 Census, 129 million Indians (10.6%) spoke English. 259,678 (0.02%) Indians spoke English as their first language. It concluded that approximately 83 million Indians (6.8%) reported English as their second language, and 46 million (3.8%) reported it as their third language, making English the second-most spoken language in India.

India ranks 50 out of 100 countries in the 2021 EF English Proficiency Index published by the EF Education First. The index gives the country a score of 496 indicating "low proficiency". India ranks 8th out of 24 Asian countries included in the index. Among Asian countries, Singapore, the Philippines, Malaysia, South Korea and China (including Hong Kong and Macau) received higher scores than India.

Writing for The New York Times, journalist Manu Joseph states that, due to the prominence and usage of the language and the desire for English-language education, "English is the de facto national language of India. It is a bitter truth." In his book, In Search of Indian English: History, Politics and Indigenisation, Ranjan Kumar Auddy shows that the history of the rise of Indian nationalism and the history of the emergence of Indian English are deeply inter-related.

Court language
Under the Indian Constitution, English is the language of India's Supreme Court and of all the high courts of India. However, as allowed by the Constitution, Hindi is also used in courts in Bihar, Madhya Pradesh, Uttar Pradesh, and Rajasthan by virtue of special presidential approval. As of 2018, the high courts of Punjab and Haryana were also awaiting presidential approval to use Hindi alongside English, and the Madras High Court has been taking steps to use Tamil alongside English.

Names
The first occurrence of the term Indian English dates from 1696, though the term did not become common until the 19th century. In the colonial era, the most common terms in use were Anglo-Indian English, or simply Anglo-Indian, both dating from 1860. Other less common terms in use were Indo-Anglian (dating from 1897) and Indo-English (1912). An item of Anglo-Indian English was known as an Anglo-Indianism from 1851.

In the modern era, a range of colloquial portmanteau words for Indian English have been used. The earliest of these is Indlish (recorded from 1962), and others include Indiglish (1974), Indenglish (1979), Indglish (1984), Indish (1984), Inglish (1985) and Indianlish (2007).

Features

Indian English generally uses the Indian numbering system. Idiomatic forms derived from Indian literary languages and vernaculars have been absorbed into Indian English. Nevertheless, there remains general homogeneity in phonetics, vocabulary, and phraseology among various dialects of Indian English.

Formal written publications in English in India tend to use lakh/crore for Indian currency and Western numbering for foreign currencies like dollars and pounds.

History

The English language established a foothold in India with the granting of the East India Company charter by Queen Elizabeth I in 1600 and the subsequent establishment of trading ports in coastal cities such as Surat, Mumbai (called Bombay before 1995), Madras (called Chennai since 1996), and Kolkata (called Calcutta before 2001).

English-language public instruction began in India in the 1830s during the rule of the British East India Company (India was then, and is today, one of the most linguistically diverse regions of the world). In 1835, English replaced Persian as the official language of the East India Company. Lord Macaulay played a major role in introducing English and Western concepts into educational institutions in India. He supported the replacement of Persian by English as the official language, the use of English as the medium of instruction in all schools, and the training of English-speaking Indians as teachers. Throughout the 1840s and 1850s, primary, middle, and high schools were opened in many districts of British India, with most high schools offering English language instruction in some subjects. In 1857, just before the end of East India Company rule, universities that were modeled on the University of London and used English as the medium of instruction were established in Bombay, Calcutta and Madras. During the British Raj (1858 to 1947), English-language penetration increased throughout India. This was driven in part by the gradually increasing hiring of Indians in the civil services. At the time of India's independence in 1947, English was the only functional lingua franca in the country.

After Indian Independence in 1947, Hindi was declared the first official language, and attempts were made to declare Hindi the sole national language of India. Due to protests from Tamil Nadu and other non-Hindi-speaking states, it was decided to temporarily retain English for official purposes until at least 1965. By the end of this period, however, opposition from non-Hindi states was still too strong to have Hindi declared the sole language. With this in mind, the English Language Amendment Bill declared English to be an associate language "until such time as all non-Hindi States had agreed to its being dropped." This has not yet occurred, and English is still widely used. For instance, it is the only reliable means of day-to-day communication between the central government and the non-Hindi states.

The view of the English language among many Indians has changed over time. It used to be associated primarily with colonialism; it is now primarily associated with economic progress, and English continues to be an official language of India.

While there is an assumption that English is readily available in India, studies show that its usage is actually restricted to the elite, because of inadequate education to large parts of the Indian population. The use of outdated teaching methods and the poor grasp of English exhibited by the authors of many guidebooks disadvantage students who rely on these books, giving India only a moderate proficiency in English.

In addition, many features of Indian English were imported into Bhutan due to the dominance of Indian-style education and teachers in the country after it withdrew from its isolation in the 1960s.

Hinglish and other hybrid languages 

The term Hinglish is a portmanteau of the languages English and Hindi. This typically refers to the macaronic hybrid use of Hindi and English. It is often the growing preferred language of the urban and semi-urban educated Indian youth, as well as the Indian diaspora abroad. The Hindi film industry, more popularly known as Bollywood, incorporates considerable amounts of Hinglish as well. Many internet platforms and voice commands on Google also recognise Hinglish. When Hindi–Urdu is viewed as a single language called Hindostani, the portmanteaus Hinglish and Urdish mean the same code-mixed tongue, where the former term is used predominantly in modern India and the latter term predominantly in Pakistan.

Other macaronic hybrids such as Minglish (Marathi and English), Manglish (Malayalam and English), Kanglish (Kannada and English), Tenglish (Telugu and English), and Tanglish or Tamglish (Tamil and English) exist in South India.

Phonology

Vowels
In general, Indian English has fewer peculiarities in its vowel sounds than the consonants, especially as spoken by native speakers of languages like Hindi, the vowel phoneme system having some similarities with that of English. Among the distinctive features of the vowel-sounds employed by some Indian English speakers:

 North Indians, especially a minority of English students and teachers along with some people in various professions like telephone customer service agents, often speak with a non-rhotic accent.
Features characteristic of North American English, such as rhoticity and r-coloured vowels, have been gaining influence on Indian English in recent years as cultural and economic ties increase between India and the United States.
 Many North Indians have an intonation pattern similar to Hiberno-English, which perhaps results from a similar pattern used while speaking Hindi.
 Diphthong  is pronounced as 
 Diphthong  is pronounced as 
 Diphthong  is pronounced as 
  may be more front  or central 
  can be more mid central  or open-mid 
  may be lower .
  may be more central , especially before /l/.
 Most Indians have the trap–bath split of Received Pronunciation, affecting words such as class, staff and last (and  respectively). Though the trap-bath split is prevalent in Indian English, it varies greatly. Many younger Indians who read and listen to American English do not have this split. The distribution is somewhat similar to Australian English in Regional Indian English varieties, but it has a complete split in Cultivated Indian English and Standard Indian English varieties.
 Most Indians do not have the hoarse-horse merger.
The following are some variations in Indian English resulting from not distinguishing a few vowels:

Consonants
The following are the characteristics of dialect of Indian English most similar to RP:

 The voiceless plosives  are always unaspirated in Indian English, (aspirated in cultivated form) whereas in RP, General American and most other English accents they are aspirated in word-initial or stressed syllables. Thus "pin" is pronounced  in Indian English but  in most other dialects. In native Indian languages (except in Dravidian languages such as Tamil), the distinction between aspirated and unaspirated plosives is phonemic, and the English stops are equated with the unaspirated rather than the aspirated phonemes of the local languages. The same is true of the voiceless postalveolar affricate .
In Indian languages there are two entirely distinct sets of coronal plosives: one dental and the other retroflex. Native speakers of Indian languages prefer to pronounce the English alveolar plosives sound as more retroflex than dental, and the use of retroflex consonants is a common feature of Indian English. In the Devanagari script of Hindi, all alveolar plosives of English are transcribed as their retroflex counterparts. One good reason for this is that unlike most other native Indian languages, Hindi does not have true retroflex plosives (Tiwari, [1955] 2001). The so-called retroflexes in Hindi are actually articulated as apical post-alveolar plosives, sometimes even with a tendency to come down to the alveolar region. So a Hindi speaker normally cannot distinguish the difference between their own apical post-alveolar plosives and English's alveolar plosives. Languages such as Tamil have true retroflex plosives, however, wherein the articulation is done with the tongue curved upwards and backwards at the roof of the mouth. Mostly in south India, some speakers allophonically further change the voiced retroflex plosives to voiced retroflex flap , and the nasal  to a nasalised retroflex flap.
The following are the variations in Indian English:
 The rhotic consonant /r/ is pronounced by most speakers as an alveolar tap , but may also be pronounced as a retroflex flap  or alveolar trill  based on the influence by the native phonology, or an alveolar approximant  like in most varieties of English.
 Pronunciations vary between rhotic and non-rhotic; with pronunciations leaning towards native phonology being generally rhotic, and others being non-rhotic. 
In recent years, rhoticity has been increasing. Generally, American English is seen as having a large influence on the English language in India recently.
Thus, wet and vet are often homophones.
 In case of the postalveolar affricates  , native languages like Hindi have corresponding affricates articulated from the palatal region, rather than postalveolar, and they have more of a stop component than fricative; this is reflected in their English.
Syllable nuclei in words with the spelling er/re (a schwa in RP and an r-coloured schwa in GA) are also replaced by VC clusters. e.g., metre,  → .
 Indian English uses clear  in all instances like Irish English whereas other varieties use clear  in syllable-initial positions and dark l  (velarised-L) in coda and syllabic positions.
The following are variations in Indian English due to language contact with Indian languages:
 Most Indian languages (except Hindustani varieties, Assamese, Marathi and Konkani) lack the voiced alveolar fricative . A significant portion of Indians thus, even though their native languages do have its nearest equivalent: the unvoiced , often use the voiced palatal affricate (or postalveolar) , just as with a Korean accent. This replacement is equally true for Persian and Arabic loanwords into Hindi. The probable reason is the confusion created by the use of the Devanagari grapheme  (for /dʒ/) with a dot beneath it to represent  (as ). This is common among people without formal English education. The same happens in Bengali as well. 
Retroflex and dental consonants are not present and only alveolar consonants are used unlike other Indian languages.
Exactly the opposite is seen for many Bengalis.
 Inability to pronounce certain (especially word-initial) consonant clusters by people of rural backgrounds, as with some Spanish-speakers. This is usually dealt with by epenthesis. e.g.,  .
 Many Indians with lower exposure to English also may pronounce  as an aspirated voiceless bilabial plosive . Again note that in Hindi Devanagari the loaned  from Persian and Arabic is written by putting a dot beneath the grapheme for native  : .
 Many speakers of Indian English do not use the voiced postalveolar fricative. Some Indians use  or  instead, e.g.

Spelling pronunciation
A number of distinctive features of Indian English are due to "the vagaries of English spelling". Most Indian languages, unlike English, have a nearly phonetic spelling, so the spelling of a word is a highly reliable guide to its modern pronunciation. Indians' tendency to pronounce English phonetically as well can cause divergence from British English. This phenomenon is known as spelling pronunciation.
 In words where the digraph  represents a voiced velar plosive in other accents, some Indian English speakers supply a murmured version , for example  . No other accent of English admits this voiced aspiration.
This trait is also present in other South Asian dialects (Pakistani and Sri Lankan English).
 Silent letters may be pronounced. For example, 'salmon' is usually pronounced with a distinct .

Supra-segmental features
English is a stress-timed language. Both syllable stress and word stress (where only certain words in a sentence or phrase are stressed) are important features of Received Pronunciation. Indian native languages are actually syllable-timed languages, like French. Indian-English speakers usually speak with a syllabic rhythm. Further, in some Indian languages, stress is associated with a low pitch, whereas in most English dialects, stressed syllables are generally pronounced with a higher pitch. Thus, when some Indian speakers speak, they appear to put the stress accents at the wrong syllables, or accentuate all the syllables of a long English word. Certain Indian accents possess a "sing-song" quality, a feature seen in a few English dialects of Britain, such as Scouse and Welsh English.

Numbering system
The Indian numbering system is preferred for digit grouping. When written in words, or when spoken, numbers less than 100,000/100 000 are expressed just as they are in Standard English. Numbers including and beyond 100,000/100 000 are expressed in a subset of the Indian numbering system. Thus, the following scale is used:

Larger numbers are generally expressed as multiples of the above (for example, one lakh crores for one trillion).

Vocabulary

Indian English includes many political, sociological, and administrative terms, such as dharna, hartal, eve-teasing, vote bank, swaraj, swadeshi, scheduled caste, scheduled tribe, and NRI. It incorporates some Anglo-Indian words such as tiffin, hill station, gymkhana, along with slang.

Some examples of words and phrases unique to, or chiefly used in, standard written Indian English include:

 academics (noun) (also Canadian and U.S. English): Academic pursuits in contrast to technical or practical work.
 e.g. "For 14 years he immersed himself in academics and was a fine achiever." (Hindu (Madras), 6 Dec 1991 27/2)
 avail (verb): take advantage of an opportunity or resource
 brinjal (noun): eggplant/aubergine
 cinema hall (noun): A cinema or movie theatre.
 e.g. "Cinema halls in Uttar Pradesh will soon display the newly-unveiled logo for Kumbh Mela, right after the national anthem is played" (Times of India, 3 Jan 2018)
 do the needful: To do that which is necessary or required, with the respectful implication that the other party is trusted to understand what needs doing without being given detailed instructions.
 e.g. "When asked if the UP government could reduce Value Added Tax (VAT) on petro-products to bring down prices, the CM said that the state government was aware of the situation and will do the needful." (2018 The Pioneer)
 Kindly adjust: used to acknowledge and apologize for something that causes problems or difficulties and ask people to accept and adapt to the situation, or used to apologize for causing inconvenience. 
eg. "The store will be closed this afternoon due to staffing shortages. Kindly adjust."
 eg: When asking someone to move along so you can sit down. "I would like to sit down, sir. Kindly adjust".
 English-knowing (adjective): Of a person or group of people that uses or speaks English.
 e.g. "The official and Service atmosphere... set the tone for almost all Indian middle-class life, especially the English-knowing intelligentsia." (Toward Freedom vii. 40, J. Nehru, 1941)
 Foreign-returned (adjective): Of a person or group of people who's returned home after living abroad for a while
 freeship (noun): A studentship or scholarship.
 e.g. "Two permanent freeships, each tenable for one year and one of which is for the second and the other for the third year class." (Med. Reporter (Calcutta) 57/1, 1 Feb 1893)
 e.g. "Private institutions can only develop if they are allowed to charge reasonable fees, while also providing need based freeships and scholarships for a certain percentage of students." (Economic Times (India) (Nexis), 12 Oct 2006) 
 hotel (noun): A restaurant or café. 
 e.g. "A group of four friends had gone to have dinner at a roadside hotel." (Statesman (Calcutta), 10 Feb 1999, (Midweek section) 4/3)
 lady finger/lady's finger (noun): okra
 matrimonial (noun): Advertisements in a newspaper for the purpose of finding a marriageable partner.
 e.g. "When I have a job I'll have to begin a whole new search for my better half... Back to the newspaper matrimonials on Sundays." (Statesman (Calcutta), 10 Feb 1999, (Midweek section) 4/3)
Out of station: used for saying that someone is away. This phrase has its origins in the posting of army officers to particular "stations" during the days of the East India Company.
 pass(ing) out (phrase): graduate from school/college or complete your course at an institution.
 e.g. "I passed out of college in 2007."
 e.g. "I passed out of my school at age of 17."
 petrol pump / petrol bunk (used in some parts of south India) (noun): a petrol station (British English), gas station (American English)
 bus stand (noun): a bus station (British English)
 Highway (noun): a motorway (British English), Freeway (American English)
 Road junction/circle (noun): a crossroad (British English), intersection (American English)
 press person (noun, frequently as a single word): A newspaper journalist, a reporter, a member of the press.
 e.g. "The Prime Minister greeted the presspersons with a 'namaskar' [customary Hindu greeting] and a broad smile." (Hindu (Nexis), 20 June 2001)
 redressal (noun): redress
 e.g. "There is an urgent need for setting up an independent authority for redressal of telecom consumer complaints." (Statesman (India) (Nexis), 2 Apr 1998)
 e.g. "Where does he go for the redressal of his genuine grievances?" (Sunday Times of India, 15 Sep 2002 8/4)
 upgradation (noun) The enhancement or upgrading of status, value or level of something.
 e.g. "Our Company lays great stress on technical training and knowledge upgradation." (Business India, 8 Sep 1986 153/1 (advert))
 revert (verb): To report back with information.
 e.g. "Please revert with the required documentation."
 chain-snatching (verb): To snatch a gold-chain (or sometimes silver-chains) from a woman (or a man) and run away, usually perpetrated by 2 or more criminals on a motorbike/moped/scooter. 
 e.g. "Women, (as well as men), are avoiding wearing gold-chains due to the concerning rise in number of chain-snatching cases in many parts of the city."
 prepone (verb): To bring (something) forward to an earlier date or time. 
 e.g. "The meeting has been preponed due to a change in the schedule."
footpath (noun) (also Australian English, British English, Hiberno-English): a sidewalk (American English).
 e.g. "Pedestrian trips account for a quarter to a third of all trips in many Indian cities, yet, footpaths are designed as an afterthought to vehicles and commercial establishments." (The Hindu, 29 Nov 2019)
 capsicum (noun) (also Australian English): Bell pepper
 e.g. "He is allergic to capsicum."
 communalism is a word meaning the creation of hatred between different religions and ethnicities which cause communal violence between them. The term is usually used to describe the hatred spread by religious leaders and politicians which cause Hindu-Muslim riots.
 votebank is a political term used to refer a particular bloc of voters from a single community or a group of communities who always back a certain candidate or political party for bribes and/or employment favours given by the particular party.

Spelling
Spelling practices in Indian English generally follow the British style, e.g., using travelling, litre, practise (as a verb), anaesthesia, fulfil, catalogue and colour, rather than the American style.

Dictionaries
The most famous dictionary of Indian English is Yule and Brunell's Hobson-Jobson, originally published in 1886 with an expanded edition edited by William Crooke in 1903, widely available in reprint since the 1960s.

Numerous other dictionaries ostensibly covering Indian English, though for the most part being merely collections of administratively-useful words from local languages, include (chronologically): Rousseau A Dictionary of Words used in the East Indies (1804), Wilkins Glossary to the Fifth Report (1813), Stocqueler The Oriental Interpreter and Treasury of East Indian Knowledge (1844), Elliot A Supplement to the Glossary of Indian Terms: A-J (1845), Brown The Zillah Dictionary in the Roman Character (1852), Carnegy Kutcherry Technicalities (1853) and its second edition Kachahri Technicalities (1877), Wilson Glossary of Judicial and Revenue Terms (1855), Giles A Glossary of Reference, on Subjects connected with the Far East (1878), Whitworth Anglo-Indian Dictionary (1885), Temple A Glossary of Indian Terms relating to Religion, Customs, Government, Land (1897), and Crooke Things India: Being Discursive Notes on Various Subjects connected with India (1906).

The first dictionary of Indian English to be published after independence was Hawkins Common Indian Words in English (1984). Other efforts include (chronologically): Lewis Sahibs, Nabobs and Boxwallahs (1991), Muthiah Words in Indian English (1991), Sengupta's Indian English supplement  to the Oxford Advanced Learner's Dictionary (1996) and Hankin Hanklyn-Janklin  (2003). Nihalani et al. Indian and British English: A Handbook of Usage and Pronunciation (2004) delineates how Indian English differs from British English for a large number of specific lexical items. The Macmillan publishing company also produced a range of synchronic general dictionaries for the Indian market, such as the Macmillan Comprehensive Dictionary (2006).

The most recent and comprehensive dictionary is Carls A Dictionary of Indian English, with a Supplement on Word-formation Patterns (2017).

See also

 Regional differences and dialects in Indian English
 Indian English literature
 Indian numbering system
 Languages with official status in India
 Indian States by most popular languages
 Kanglish 
 Hinglish
 Manglish
 Pakistani English/Paklish
 Bangladeshi English/Banglish
 Tanglish
 Tenglish
 English as a lingua franca
 Regional accents of English

References

Bibliography 

 Auddy, Ranjan Kumar (2020). In Search of Indian English: History, Politics and Indigenisation.London & New York: Routledge.  &

Further reading

External links
 
 Indian general spoken Problems in English .
 Indian Pronunciation Problems in English, ESLAN.
 'Hover & Hear' pronunciations in a Standard Indian English accent, and compare side by side with other English accents from around the World.
 "Linguistic and Social Characteristics of Indian English" by Jason Baldridge: An analysis of Indian language published by the "Language In India" magazine.
 On the future of Indian English, by Gurcharan Das.
 An exploration into linguistic majority-minority relations in India, by B. Mallikarjun.
 108 varieties of Indian English, Dharma Kumar, India Seminar, 2001 (Volume 500).
 India Human Development Survey-II 2011–2012
English to Hindi
Indian Novels in English: Texts, Contexts and Language Hardcover – 2018 by Jaydeep Sarangi (Author)

 
Languages of India
Dialects of English